This is a list of albums, mixtapes and EPs released by artists affiliated with the Wu-Tang Clan, known as the Wu-Tang Killa Beez or the Wu-Family.

Discography

Affiliates of affiliates 
This is a list of records released under one of the Wu-Tang sub-brands (such as Chambermusik) that may be from an artist who doesn't necessarily represent the Wu-Tang style or sound.

External links
https://archive.today/20121216135105/http://www.wu-international.com/

Hip hop discographies
Lists of albums